The 1990 Campeonato Ecuatoriano de Fútbol de la Serie A was the 32nd season of the Serie A, the top level of professional football in Ecuador.

LDU Quito won their fourth national championship under the guidance of manager Polo Carrera. Their title was won on December 23 when they defeated Barcelona 3–1 at Estadio Olímpico Atahualpa.

First stage

Second stage
Universidad Católica, winners of the 1990 Serie B E1, were promoted to the Serie A for this stage.

Aggregate table
Since five of the eight spots for the Third Stage were filled in based on their performance in the previous stages, an aggregate table of the First and Second Stages was used to determine who would fill in the remaining three space, as well as who would complete the Relegation Liguilla.

Third stage

Group 1

Group 2

Relegation Liguilla

Liguilla Final

Second-place playoffs

External links
Official website 
1990 season on RSSSF

1990
Ecu
 Football